Rautavesi (Hartola) is a medium-sized lake of Finland. It is located in Hartola and Joutsa municipalities, in the regions Central Finland and Päijänne Tavastia. The water quality in the lake is excellent. Water flows down to the lake Jääsjärvi. The lake is quite near to the Finnish national road 4, about ten kilometers southwards from Joutsa.

See also
List of lakes in Finland

References

Lakes of Hartola